Leandra subseriata is a species of plant in the family Melastomataceae.

References

subseriata
Taxa named by Charles Victor Naudin
Plants described in 1852